The Candelária Formation, in other literature also referred to as Candelária Sequence, is a sedimentary formation of the Santa Maria Group (also called Santa Maria Supersequence) in the Paraná Basin in Rio Grande do Sul, southeastern Brazil. The formation dates to the Carnian of the Late Triassic, locally referred to as Tuvalian, from 231.4 to approximately 222 Ma.

The Candelária Formation is composed of mudstones and sandstones deposited in a lacustrine to deltaic (distal floodplain) environment. It overlies the Santa Maria Formation and is partly overlain by and partly laterally equivalent to the Caturrita Formation. The formation comprises two Assemblage zones; the older Hyperodapedon and the younger Riograndia Assemblage Zones. Several cynodonts and other therapsids as well as early dinosaurs were found in the formation in the vicinity of Agudo.

Description 

The Candelária Formation or Sequence corresponds to a third-order sequence placed in the Santa Maria Supersequence. The basal portion of the formation consists of a coarsening-upward succession that begins with red mudstones, interbedded with small-scale trough cross-bedded sandstone lenses. Rhythmites and sigmoidal massive to climbing cross-laminated sandstone bodies are also present. This facies association is interpreted as a lacustrine to deltaic (distal floodplain) depositional environment in a humid climate. The formation contains the Hyperodapedon and Riograndia Assemblage Zones.

The red beds are divided into a non-fossiliferous portion at the base, and an upper fossiliferous unit. Coprolites and putative rhizoliths are present. A light-colored cross-bedded sandstone also occurs at the top of the formation and represents a river channel. It is delimited by an erosive contact with the underlying red beds.

The Candelária Formation is considered a local equivalent of the Caturrita Formation, which it partly underlies. It overlies the Santa Maria Formation. The formation is correlated with the Ischigualasto Formation of the Ischigualasto-Villa Unión Basin in northwestern Argentina.

Basin history 

Before the opening of the South Atlantic, a rifting phase that started in the Jurassic, the basin was connected to the basins of present-day southern Africa. The Candelária Formation forms part of the Gondwana II Supersequence representing the onset of continental deposition in the Paraná Basin. The Triassic paleofauna of the Paraná Basin is correlated with the African faunas of the Omingonde Formation of the Waterberg Basin in Namibia, the Molteno Formation of the Karoo Basin in South Africa and the Fremouw Formation of present-day Antarctica.

Fossil content 

The formation has provided fossils of therapsids characteristic of the Late Triassic, as well as early dinosaurs.

See also 
 List of dinosaur-bearing rock formations
 Chañares Formation, fossiliferous formation of the Ischigualasto-Villa Unión Basin, Argentina
 Santa Juana Formation, contemporaneous fossiliferous formation of south-central Chile
 Molteno Formation, contemporaneous fossiliferous formation of Lesotho and South Africa
 Pebbly Arkose Formation, contemporaneous fossiliferous formation of Botswana, Zambia and Zimbabwe
 Denmark Hill Insect Bed, contemporaneous fossiliferous unit of Queensland, Australia
 Madygen Formation, contemporaneous Lagerstätte of Kyrgyzstan

References

Bibliography

Further reading 

 

Geologic formations of Brazil
Triassic System of South America
Late Triassic South America
Triassic Brazil
Carnian Stage
Mudstone formations
Sandstone formations
Deltaic deposits
Fluvial deposits
Lacustrine deposits
Formations
Fossiliferous stratigraphic units of South America
Paleontology in Brazil
Formations